The 1980–81 Honduran Liga Nacional season was the 15th edition of the Honduran Liga Nacional.  The format of the tournament remained the same as the previous season.  Real C.D. España won the title after defeating C.D. Marathón in a 3-series final.  Both teams qualified to the 1981 CONCACAF Champions' Cup.  Additionally, Real España, Marathón, Club Deportivo Olimpia and C.D.S. Vida obtained berths to the 1981 Copa Fraternidad.  Due to the national team's participation at the 1982 FIFA World Cup qualifiers, the league defined that no relegation was to take place this season.  C.D. Platense which finished last, was financially penalized though.

1980–81 teams

 Atlético Morazán (Tegucigalpa, promoted)
 Broncos (Choluteca)
 Marathón (San Pedro Sula)
 Motagua (Tegucigalpa)
 Olimpia (Tegucigalpa)
 Platense (Puerto Cortés)
 Real España (San Pedro Sula)
 Universidad (Tegucigalpa)
 Victoria (La Ceiba)
 Vida (La Ceiba)

Regular season

Standings

 No relegation this season.

Final round

Pentagonal standings

Final

Top scorer
  Luis O. Altamirano (Broncos) with 13 goals

Squads

Known results

Round 1

Round 22

Pentagonal

Unknown rounds

References

Liga Nacional de Fútbol Profesional de Honduras seasons
1
Honduras